The 2010 Brazil Open Series was a professional tennis tournament played on outdoor red clay courts. It was part of the 2010 ATP Challenger Tour. It took place in Curitiba, Brazil between 19 and 25 April 2010.

ATP entrants

Seeds

 Rankings are as of April 5, 2010.

Other entrants
The following players received wildcards into the singles main draw:
  Guilherme Clézar
  Tiago Fernandes
  Fernando Romboli
  Thomas Takemoto

The following players received special exempt into the singles main draw:
  Bastian Knittel
  Leonardo Tavares

The following players received entry from the qualifying draw:
  Aljaž Bedene
  Marcelo Demoliner
  Rogério Dutra da Silva
  Iván Miranda

Champions

Singles

 Dominik Meffert def.  Ricardo Mello, 6–4, 6–7(3), 6–2

Doubles

 Dominik Meffert /  Leonardo Tavares def.  Ramón Delgado /  André Sá, 3–6, 6–2, [10–2]

References

ITF search 

2010 ATP Challenger Tour
Tennis tournaments in Brazil